Sylvain Vasseur (born 28 February 1946) is a French former professional racing cyclist. He rode in six editions of the Tour de France.

Major results
Source:
1969
 6th Overall Four Days of Dunkirk
 7th Circuit des Frontières
1972
 1st  Overall Tour du Nord
 5th Overall Étoile des Espoirs
 7th GP de Fourmies
1973
 1st  Overall Tour of Luxembourg
1st Stage 3
1974
 5th Overall Critérium National de la Route
 8th Overall Tour de l'Aude
 8th Circuit des Frontières
 9th Bordeaux–Paris
1975
 3rd Circuit des Frontières
 10th Overall Paris–Nice
1977
 9th Circuit de l'Indre

Grand Tour general classification results timeline

References

External links
 

1946 births
Living people
French male cyclists
Sportspeople from Eure
Cyclists from Normandy